The Hyde Close drill hall is a former military installation in Winchester. It is a Grade II listed building.

History
The building was designed by Sir John Soane and completed in 1795. After a period as a school operating under the leadership of the Reverend Charles Richards, and then as a local headquarters for the Salvation Army, it became the headquarters of the Hampshire Yeomanry Cavalry (Carabiniers) in the late 19th century. The regiment was mobilised at the drill hall in August 1914 before being deployed to the Western Front. After the regiment converted to an artillery unit, the hall was decommissioned and converted for retail use. It is currently used as a carpet showroom.

References

Drill halls in England
Buildings and structures in Winchester
John Soane buildings
Grade II listed buildings in Hampshire